Hero Fortress (Russian: крепость-герой, krepost'-geroy) is the honorary title awarded in 1965 to the Soviet Brest Fortress in Brest, Belarus, (previously part of the Byelorussian SSR) for the defence of the frontier stronghold during the very first weeks of the German-Soviet War 1941 - 1945.

The title Hero Fortress corresponds to the title Hero City, which was awarded to twelve Soviet cities.

References

Soviet awards
History of Brest, Belarus